Share What Ya Got is the first full-length album by the folk punk band Defiance, Ohio. It was followed by The Great Depression in 2006.

Tracks 1, 3 and 11 were recorded at Steven's Gonna Die studios in Neenah, Wisconsin' in December 2002. Tracks 7 to 9 were recorded on June 12, 2003, and all other tracks were recorded in March 2003 at Danger Room Studios in Dayton, Ohio.

Track listing 

Tracks 7-9 were not included on the first pressing.

Personnel 
Music
 BZ – violin
 Geoff Hing – guitar, vocals
 Ryan Woods – double bass, vocals
 Sherri Miller – cello, vocals
 Will Staler – drums, guitar, vocals

Production
 Pogo – mastering
 Chris Common – engineer (tracks 2, 4–10, 12)
 Joe Crane – engineer (tracks 1, 3, 11)
 Greg Blakemore – engineer (tracks 13, 14)

References 

Albums free for download by copyright owner
2004 debut albums
Defiance, Ohio (band) albums